The War Memorial of Musocco commemorates the fallen of old town of Musocco during the First World War. Musocco incorporated in Milan in 1923. It's located in Piazzale Santorre di Santarosa into Quartiere Varesina covering all the four directions of the square, and it's clearly visible along Viale Espinasse.

The monument was inaugurated in 1924 and is the work of Ugo Prat.

It stands on a plinth surmounted by an iron crown while in the west and east stand two statues of women in marble. On the base two bas-reliefs in bronze complete the work.

A bed surrounds the monument and on it, under the statues, two commemorative stones list the names of the fallen.

In 2008, after the plaques with the names of the fallen had become illegible, the monument was restored.

Two statues 

The statue to the east, towards Via De Rossi, represents Italy and the marble is inscribed: Musocco ai suoi caduti, Musocco its glorious fallen.

The second woman to the west, towards Via Galliari, has a book in her hand entitled, Storia, meaning  History; below, on the marble, it shows the dates in Roman numerals of the beginning and end of World War I for Italy: XXIV-V-MCMXV IV-XI-MCMXVIII.

Bas-reliefs 

On the base to the south, the direction of Piazzale Accursio, a bronze bas-relief representing the figure of Jesus illuminating a soldier in the moment of death, fallen in sacrifice for Italy.

To the north the second bas-relief representing a mass when the celebrant, facing the altar, raises the Eucharist. A gathering of soldiers in uniforms and helmets attends the ceremony, commemorating the sacrifice of those who died for their country. The setting takes is outdoors, showing a tree behind the altar.

Commemorative stones 

Two commemorative stones list the names of the fallen in the bed under the statues.

On the north side, names between Agostoni and Gatti are displayed, while the south holds the rest, from Gerosa to Villa names.

Notes 

World War I memorials in Italy
Buildings and structures in Milan